Lee Konitz with Warne Marsh is a 1955 studio album by jazz saxophonists Lee Konitz and Warne Marsh. The Atlantic catalogue number was SD 1217. It was recorded on June 14, 1955, at Coastal Studios in New York City.

The album was re-released on LP by Atlantic Records in 1982, newly remastered by George Piros.

Critical reception 

Billboard said "This album is remarkable not only for the superb modern musicianship...but for their successful use of varied old and new jazz sources."

John Fordham of The Guardian said "if these two saxophonists play with an even, almost chilly undemonstrativeness, their melodic ingenuity is dazzling". Peter Marsh, writing for BBC Music, said "Graceful, intelligent improvising that swings - what more could you want? Highly recommended." Scott Yanow, writing for AllMusic, said they "always made for a perfect team."

The Penguin Guide to Jazz selected this album as part of its suggested Core Collection.

Track listing

Personnel 

 Lee Konitz – alto saxophone
 Warne Marsh – tenor saxophone
 Sal Mosca – piano (tracks 2, 4-6, 8)
 Ronnie Ball – piano (track 7)
 Billy Bauer – guitar
 Oscar Pettiford – double bass
 Kenny Clarke – drums

Production
 Nesuhi Ertegun – producer
 Claude Nobs – producer (reissue)
 William Claxton – photography

References 

Lee Konitz albums
Warne Marsh albums
Albums produced by Nesuhi Ertegun
Atlantic Records albums
1955 albums